The Iron Heel of Oligarchy ( Zheleznaya pyata oligarkhii) is a 1999 Russian drama film directed by and starring Aleksandr Bashirov. It tells the story of a man who tries to organise a revolution against the oligarchs in Russia. The film is loosely based on episodes from Jack London's 1907 novel The Iron Heel. It received a Tiger Award at the 1999 International Film Festival Rotterdam.

Cast
 Aleksandr Bashirov as Nikolai Petrovich
 Evgeniy Fyodorov as Brother-in-arms
 Konstantin Fyodorov as Brother-in-arms
 Sergei Kagadeyev as Koordinator
 Aleksandr Voronov as Brother-in-arms

See also
 The Iron Heel (film)

References

1999 drama films
1999 films
Films about revolutions
Films based on American novels
Films based on works by Jack London
Films set in Saint Petersburg
Oligarchy
Russian drama films
1990s Russian-language films
Films based on science fiction novels